The 2014 Italian F4 Championship was the inaugural season of the Italian F4 Championship, as it replaces Formula Abarth. It began on 8 June in Adria and finished on 12 October in Imola after seven triple header rounds.

The championship was won by Canadian driver Lance Stroll, a member of the Ferrari Driver Academy, taking 7 overall victories and 3 further class victories from 18 races contested – he missed the final round at Imola due to injury. Stroll, driving for Prema Powerteam, finished 94 points clear of his closest championship rival, Mattia Drudi of the F & M team. Drudi won four races overall, including a hat-trick at Monza, as well as a class victory in the final race of the season. Third in the championship went to Diegi Motorsport driver Andrea Russo, taking an overall victory at Adria, as well as a class victory at Mugello. Euronova Racing by Fortec's Ukyo Sasahara, and his replacement, Andrea Fontana were the only other eligible drivers to take an overall victory, with wins at Adria and Magione respectively. Fontana also achieved a class victory at Imola, while the third Imola class win was taken by SMP Racing by Euronova and Ivan Matveev. Prema Powerteam won the teams' championship, 58 points clear of Euronova Racing by Fortec.

In the concurrent Italian F4 Trophy for drivers over the age of 18, the championship was dominated by Prema Powerteam's Brandon Maïsano. Maïsano won the first 10 races of the season, and ultimately finished the season with 17 class wins and 19 podiums from the 21 races. Maïsano also achieved six overall victories during the season, but was ineligible to score points towards the main championship. He finished 176 points clear of his next closest rival, Ali Al-Khalifa, who took a single class win at Magione. Keith Camilleri finished third in class with nine second place finishes, while Sennan Fielding was the only other driver to take part in the class; he achieved three class wins, including an overall win at Imola, from his six starts.

Teams and drivers

 Aleksandra Zabolotnyaya was scheduled to compete for SMP Racing by Euronova, but did not appear at any rounds.

Race calendar and results
The calendar was published on 8 February 2014. The series was scheduled to be a part of the ACI Racing Weekends for five rounds during the 2014 season, with the rounds in Monza and Montmeló being held in support of International GT Open. However, the final round at Montmeló was replaced by another Imola round, and thus, all rounds were held in Italy.

Notes

Championship standings
Points were awarded as follows:

The Trophy Class had the same point system but without points for the fastest time in the qualifying sessions and fastest laps.

Drivers' standings

Teams' standings

Italian F4 Winter Trophy

Teams and drivers

Race calendar and results
All races were held at Adria International Raceway in Italy.

Results

References

External links

Italian F4 Championship seasons
F4 Championship
Italian F4